The slender duckbill eel (Hoplunnis punctata) is an eel in the family Nettastomatidae (duckbill/witch eels). It was described by Charles Tate Regan in 1915. It is a marine, deep water-dwelling eel which is known from the Gulf of Guinea, in the eastern Atlantic Ocean. It inhabits the continental shelf and slope.

References

Nettastomatidae
Fish described in 1915